Belfalls is an unincorporated community in Bell County, Texas, United States. According to the Handbook of Texas, the community had a population of 20 in 2000. It is located within the Killeen-Temple-Fort Hood metropolitan area.

History
Belfalls was given this name as a combination of Bell and Falls counties and had a double voting box for both counties. A post office was established at Belfalls in 1891 and remained in operation until 1907. 260 people were living in Belfalls that were served by a hotel, a Baptist church, a mill and gin, two general stores, and two other businesses in 1896. Mail was then delivered to the community from nearby Oenaville. A lake was dug to supply water to the Belfalls Water Company by mule power around 1915. The community's population plunged to 84 by 1913 but returned to 200 in 1947 with six businesses. It continued to decline in the 1950s, and by 1964, the population dropped to 50, then to 20 from 1988 through 2000.

Geography

Education
In 1903, Belfalls had a school with 69 students and two teachers. Today, the community is served by the Troy Independent School District.

Notable person
 Elmer B. Elliott, speaker at the Florida House of Representatives, was born in Belfalls.

References

Unincorporated communities in Bell County, Texas
Unincorporated communities in Texas